Pakistan International Airlines Corp v Times Travel (UK) Ltd [2021] UKSC 40 is an English contract law case, concerning economic duress.

Facts
Times Travel, travel agents, claimed to set aside an agreement with Pakistan International Airlines Corporation, which was the only operator of direct flights from the UK to Pakistan. That was most of TT's business. Agents had brought claims for nonpayment of commissions, and PIAC aimed to start new contracts and force the agents to accept them and waive existing claim for unpaid commissions. TT accepted the terms, and then claimed it entered the new deal under economic duress. It sought to recover its commissions.

In the High Court, Warren J held there was economic duress. The Court of Appeal held the claimant failed to establish economic duress, since the pressure was lawful and there was no bad faith.

Judgment
The Supreme Court held there was no duress. PIAC giving notice that the previous contract would be terminated and cutting TT's ticket allocation was not reprehensible conduct in the sense used in the case law, and it genuinely believed it was not liable to pay the disputed commissions.

Lord Hodge (Lord Reed, Lord Lloyd-Jones and Lord Kitchin agreeing) said the following:

Lord Burrows concurred in the result, but reasoned his judgment as follows.

See also
English contract law

Notes

References

Supreme Court of the United Kingdom cases